is a Japanese television drama series that premiered on TV Asahi on 21 October 2011. Ryunosuke Kamiki plays the lead role, and Ryōko Hirosue plays the role of a family ghost. It received a peak viewership rating of 11.4%, and 8.7% overall average.

Cast
 Ryunosuke Kamiki as Kazuo Sanada
 Seiichi Tanabe as Minoru Sanada
 Yasuko Mitsuura as Megumi Sanada
 Kasumi Arimura as Niko Sanada
 Miki Kanai as Mitsuko Sanada
 Takuma Hiraoka as Shirō Sanada
 Seishiro Kato as Saigo Sanada
 Gen Hoshino as Hiroyuki Sanada
 Ryōko Hirosue as Megumi Sanada

References

External links
   at TV Asahi (Archived from the original 23 September 2011) 
 

2011 in Japanese television
2011 Japanese television series debuts
2011 Japanese television series endings
TV Asahi television dramas
Japanese drama television series
Television shows written by Kankurō Kudō